Jim Hower  (3 September 1931 – 16 June 2008) was an Australian rules footballer who played with the Collingwood in the Victorian Football League (VFL).

Notes

External links 

1931 births
2008 deaths
Australian rules footballers from Victoria (Australia)
Collingwood Football Club players